Sara Squadrani (born 14 February 1986) is an Italian soprano singer, best known as a vocalist of the Italian symphonic power metal band Ancient Bards since 2007.

She has also collaborated with Arjen Anthony Lucassen's metal opera project Ayreon in 2013 and has a made guest appearance on album The Theory of Everything as a character called "The Girl". In 2016, she also collaborated with Italian power metal band Trick or Treat on the album Rabbits' Hill Pt. 2.

Besides singing, she studies at the University of Bologna, aiming to become an architect and building engineer.

Discography

Ancient Bards
The Black Crystal Sword Saga;
 The Alliance of the Kings (2010)
 Soulless Child (2011)
 A New Dawn Ending (2014)
 Origine The Black Crystal Sword Saga Part 2 (2019)

EPs;
 Trailer of the Black Crystal Sword Saga (2008)

Guest appearances
 Ayreon – The Theory of Everything – 2013
 Trick or Treat – Rabbits' Hill Pt. 2 – vocals on "Never Say Goodbye" – 2016

References

External links
 All Things Sara – personal weblog
 Ancient Bards' official website

1986 births
Italian sopranos
Women heavy metal singers
Living people
21st-century Italian singers
21st-century Italian women singers